Veronica Herber is a New Zealand artist who lives and works in Auckland. She is best known for working with Japanese Washi tape.

Education
Veronica Herber holds a Bachelor of Visual Arts with Distinction from Auckland University of Technology. At present Herber is completing a Post Graduate Diploma at Elam School of Fine Arts. The artist initially practiced painting before discovering tape as a medium.

Career

Veronica Herber has exhibited in several large-scale sculpture projects both in New Zealand and abroad. Since 2013, she has participated in the biennial outdoor sculpture exhibition, Headland: Sculpture on the Gulf, (2013, 2015, 2017), on Waiheke Island, Auckland, as well as the annual outdoor sculpture exhibition Sculpture by the Sea, (2013, 2014, 2015) in Sydney, Australia.

She has held solo exhibitions at public institutions such as Te Uru Waitakere Contemporary Gallery, Tauranga Art Gallery, and the Pah Homestead, Auckland. In 2014, Herber's public installation, Conversando Con Puebla, Pueblo, Mexico, covered a 600 year old courtyard with the artist's distinctive use of Washi tape, and in 2016, she was invited to create an installation at the Rene Portocarrero Serigrafia Studio, in Havana, Cuba.

Veronica Herber's work is included in the Chartwell Collection, Auckland Art Gallery Toi o Tāmaki, and The James Wallace Arts Trust Collection. She is the 2015 recipient of The Wallace Arts Trust New Zealand Sculptor Award, awarded each year to one participating artist in the Sculpture by the Sea, Bondi, Australia.

Work

Notable exhibitions
Swathe, James Wallace Trust, Auckland, 2017
Headland Sculpture on the Gulf, Waiheke Island, 2017, 2015, 2013
Continuum, Tauranga Art Gallery, 2017
Fold, group show, Blue Mountains Cultural Centre, Sydney, 2017
Resonance, NZ Steel Gallery, Franklin Arts Centre, Auckland, 2016
Installation at Rene Portocarrero Serigrafia Studio, Havana, Cuba, 2016
Sculpture by the Sea, Sydney, 2015, 2014, 2013
Conversando Con Puebla, Puebla, Mexico, 2014
Wallace Art Awards, Pah Homestead, Auckland 2014
Site Unseen, Te Uru Waitakere Contemporary Gallery, Auckland, 2013–2014
In Line With, group show, Antionette Godkin Gallery, Auckland, 2013
Sculpture on the Shore, Devonport, Auckland, 2012
The Sculpture Park, Waitakaruru Arboretum, Hamilton, 2012

Public collections
Chartwell Collection, Auckland Art Gallery Toi o Tāmaki
The James Wallace Arts Trust, Auckland, New Zealand

Awards and nominations
 2017     Finalist Wallace Art Awards, Auckland
 2017     Finalist Parkin Prize, Wellington
 2016     Finalist Wallace Art Awards, Auckland
 2015     Winner Wallace Arts Trust New Zealand Sculptor Award, Sculpture by the Sea, Sydney
 2014     Finalist Wallace Art Awards, Auckland
 2013     Finalist Parkin Prize, Wellington
 2012     Winner Titirangi Community Arts Council Emerging Artist Award, Titirangi, Auckland
 2012     Finalist Walker and Hall Waiheke Art Award, Waiheke Island
 2012     Winner Ebbett Prestige Environmental Award, Hamilton

References

External links
 Veronica Herber artist website
 The Chartwell Collection

New Zealand women artists
Auckland University of Technology alumni
New Zealand installation artists
Year of birth missing (living people)
Living people